Those Who Wear Glasses is a 1969 Hungarian drama film written and directed by Sándor Simó. The film won the Golden Leopard at the Locarno International Film Festival.

Cast
 István Bujtor as Valkó László
 Mari Törőcsik as Mari
 Emil Keres as Ormai
 István Avar as Tibor
 Mária Ronyecz as Jutka
 Tamás Major as Náray

References

External links
 

1969 films
1969 drama films
Hungarian drama films
1960s Hungarian-language films
Golden Leopard winners
Hungarian black-and-white films
Films directed by Sándor Simó